Vigo Metropolitan Area located in Galicia (Spain) is formed by the city of Vigo and the surrounding municipalities of Baiona, Cangas, Fornelos de Montes, Gondomar, Moaña, Mos, Nigrán, O Porriño, Pazos de Borbén, Redondela, Salceda de Caselas, Salvaterra de Miño and Soutomaior.

The population of the area is estimated at 479,256 inhabitants.

 

Metropolitan areas of Spain
Vigo